is a tram stop in Ukyo-ku, Kyoto, Japan.

Station layout 
The station consists of two street platforms, with pedestrian crossings to the adjacent footpaths.

Adjacent stations

References

External links
 
 

Stations of Keifuku Electric Railroad
Railway stations in Japan opened in 1910